Cornelis Henricus Maria "Kees" Versteegh (born 1947) is a Dutch academic linguist. He served as a professor of Islamic studies and the Arabic language at Radboud University Nijmegen in the Netherlands until April 2011.

Versteegh graduated from Radboud University in 1977, the subject of his doctoral dissertation having been the influence of Greek on Arabic. He was a lecturer in the Department of Middle Eastern Studies until 1987, when he took a position at the Netherlands Institute in Cairo for two years. Versteegh returned to Radboud in 1989, and in 2011 he became professor emeritus. Versteegh's research and views on the Arabic language and its evolution have been described as groundbreaking.

Notes

References

External links
List of books by Versteegh at BookFinder.com
List of books by Versteegh at Brill Publishers
List of books by Versteegh at Goodreads
Personal Directory Information for Versteegh at the Linguist List

Living people
Radboud University Nijmegen alumni
Academic staff of Radboud University Nijmegen
Religion academics
Dutch orientalists
Dutch Arabists
1947 births